Asanthus solidaginifolius is a Mexican species of plants in the family Asteraceae. It is native to the states of  Chihuahua and Durango in north-central Mexico.

References

Eupatorieae
Plants described in 1886
Flora of Mexico